Claudia Moll (born 25 December 1968) is a German politician of the Social Democratic Party (SPD) who has been serving as a member of the Bundestag from the state of North Rhine-Westphalia since 2017.

Political career 
Moll first became a member of the Bundestag in the 2017 German federal election in Aachen II, defeating Helmut Brandt from the CDU. In parliament, she is a member of the Health Committee. In addition to her committee assignments, she has been a member of the German delegation to the Franco-German Parliamentary Assembly since 2022.

Other activities 
 German Foundation for World Population (DSW), Member of the Parliamentary Advisory Board
 German United Services Trade Union (ver.di), Member

References

External links 

 Bundestag biography 

1968 births
Living people
Members of the Bundestag for North Rhine-Westphalia
Female members of the Bundestag
21st-century German women politicians
Members of the Bundestag 2021–2025
Members of the Bundestag 2017–2021
Members of the Bundestag for the Social Democratic Party of Germany